Nyamagasani I Hydroelectric Power Station, also Nyamagasani 1 Hydroelectric Power Station is a  hydroelectric power project, under construction in Uganda.

Location

Overview
The project company, Rwenzori Hydro Private Limited, is majority-owned by DI Frontier Market Energy & Carbon Fund, a Denmark-based renewable energy investment company.

Construction costs
The construction of this power station is budgeted at US$36.7 million, with US$9.4 million, in GetFit concessions.

See also

List of power stations in Uganda
List of hydropower stations in Africa

References

External links
 Micro Dams To The Rescue
  

Kasese District
Hydroelectric power stations in Uganda